The iPhone 4S (originally styled as iPhone 4 S, retroactively stylized with a lowercase 's' as iPhone 4s as of September 2013) is a smartphone that was designed and marketed by Apple Inc. It is the fifth generation of the iPhone, succeeding the iPhone 4 and preceding the iPhone 5. It was announced on October 4, 2011, at Apple's Cupertino campus, and was the final Apple product announced in the lifetime of former Apple CEO and co-founder Steve Jobs, who died the following day.

Orders could be placed on October 7, 2011, and mainstream availability in retail stores began on October 14, 2011 in the United States, Australia, Canada, the United Kingdom, France, Germany, and Japan. Sales peaked over its predecessor with more than a million sales in the first twenty-four hours of order availability and more than four million sales in the first four days of retail availability. Further worldwide rollout, including 22 additional countries on October 28, came during the next several months.

This iPhone was named "4S" where the "S" stood for Siri, an intelligent personal assistant that was initially exclusive to the 4S and later included in future Apple products. Retaining most of the external design of the iPhone 4, the 4S hosted major internal upgrades, including an upgrade to the Apple A5 chipset, and an 8-megapixel camera with 1080p video recording. It debuted with iOS 5, the fifth major version of iOS, Apple's mobile operating system, that introduced features including iCloud, iMessage, Notification Center, Reminders, and Twitter integration.

Reviewers noted Siri, the new camera, and processing speeds as significant advantages over the prior model. It was succeeded by the iPhone 5 as Apple's flagship smartphone on September 12, 2012. The 16 GB iPhone 4S remained on sale at a reduced price point, with the 32 and 64 GB models discontinued. The 16 GB 4S was also subsequently discontinued in September 2013 with the release of the iPhone 5C and iPhone 5S and replaced with the 8 GB model which was offered free on contract in the United States.

The 4S was officially discontinued on September 9, 2014 following the announcement of the iPhone 6, although production did continue for developing markets until February 17, 2016. During the course of its lifetime, the iPhone 4S was one of the best-selling iPhones ever produced and it is the first iPhone to support five major versions of iOS: iOS 5, iOS 6, iOS 7, iOS 8, and iOS 9 (the iPad 2 was supported from iOS 4 to iOS 9).

The 4S is the last iPhone to have the original 30 pin connector as the succeeding iPhone 5 replaced it with the all digital Lightning connector.

Origin 

As early as May 2011, some leaks had a fairly accurate description of the iPhone 4S including the name "", the Apple A5 chip, HSDPA, new camera, and Sprint carrying.

The  was unveiled at Apple's "Let's Talk iPhone" event on October 4, 2011, on the Apple Campus in Cupertino, California. The keynote was the first which Tim Cook gave since the Verizon keynote earlier in the year. Tim Carmody of Wired praised Cook for focusing on company achievements, calling him a "global business thinker" and a "taskmaster".

Capps boasted that the game uses Epic Games' Unreal Engine 3 and features the same graphic techniques used in the Xbox 360 game Gears of War 3.

Speculation about Apple's next generation smartphone, including various specifications and a predicted name "iPhone 5", had been widespread in the time preceding its debut.

All changes were internal (slight external differences between the iPhone 4 GSM model and the  exist, as said differences existed between the CDMA and GSM models of the iPhone 4).

On September 10, 2013, the iPhone 4S name was re-stylised as iPhone 4s, using a lower case 's' to reflect the names of the newly announced iPhone 5s and iPhone 5c. This was unusual for Apple as an upper case 'S' had been used since the introduction of the iPhone 3GS in 2009.

On September 9, 2014, the iPhone 4S was officially discontinued following the reveal of iPhone 6 and iPhone 6 Plus. However, 4S production did continue for developing markets until February 17, 2016.

On September 13, 2016, following the release of iOS 10, Apple dropped support for the iPhone 4S, making iOS 9 the last major iOS version available for the device.

Software 

The , like other iPhones, runs iOS, Apple's mobile operating system. The user interface of iOS is based on the concept of direct manipulation, using multi-touch gestures. Interface control elements consist of sliders, switches, and buttons. The response to user input is immediate and provides a fluid interface. Interaction with the OS includes gestures such as swipe, tap, pinch, and reverse pinch, all of which have specific definitions within the context of the iOS operating system and its multi-touch interface.

Internal accelerometers are used by some applications to respond to shaking the device (one common result is the undo command) or rotating it in three dimensions (one common result is switching from portrait to landscape mode).

The iPhone 4S was first shipped with iOS 5.0, which was released on October 12, 2011, two days before the release of the device. As of April 2021, the device can be updated to iOS 9.

It can act as a hotspot, sharing its internet connection over WiFi, Bluetooth, or USB, and also accesses the App Store, a digital application distribution platform for iOS developed and maintained by Apple. The service allows users to browse and download applications from the iTunes Store that were developed with Xcode and the iOS SDK and were published through Apple.

The iPhone 4S can play music, movies, television shows, ebooks, audiobooks, and podcasts and can sort its media library by songs, artists, albums, videos, playlists, genres, composers, podcasts, audiobooks, and compilations. Options are always presented alphabetically, except in playlists, which retain their order from iTunes. The iPhone 4S uses a large font that allows users plenty of room to touch their selection. Users can rotate their device horizontally to landscape mode to access Cover Flow. Like on iTunes, this feature shows the different album covers in a scroll-through its photograph library. Scrolling is achieved by swiping a finger across the screen. Alternatively, headset controls can be used to pause, play, skip, and repeat tracks. On the 4S, the volume can be changed with the included Apple Earphones, and the Voice Control feature can be used to identify a track, play songs in a playlist or by a specific artist, or create a Genius playlist.

The  introduced a new automated voice control system called Siri, that allows the user to give the iPhone commands, which it can execute and respond to. For example, iPhone commands such as "What is the weather going to be like?" will generate a response such as "The weather is to be cloudy and rainy and drop to 54 degrees today." These commands can vary greatly and control almost every application of the smartphone. The commands given do not have to be specific and can be used with natural language. Siri can be accessed by holding down the home button for a short amount of time (compared to using the regular function). An impact of Siri, as shown by Apple video messages, is that it is much easier for people to use device functions while driving, exercising, or when they have their hands full. It also means people with trouble reading, seeing, or typing can access the smartphone more easily.

This supports the inclusion of media in text messages, integration with the device's voice-controlled software assistant, and read receipts for sent messages. Input to the computer comes from a keyboard displayed on the multi-touch screen or by voice-to-text by speaking into the microphone. Entered text is supported by predictive and suggestion software as well as a spell-checker, that includes many regional dialects such as Swiss spoken French.

Different features have different language requirements, such as keyboards compared to the word predictor and spell-checker, which needs a large dictionary of words. Language support is related to the iOS 5 operating system that the device launched with, although not always. The Siri digital assistant supported French, English, and German at launch. Since it uses a software-based keyboard supported by the multi-touch display, it can support many different keyboard layouts without having to change physically. The  can display different languages and scripts at the same time.

On September 19, 2012, iOS 6 was released to the iPhone 4S among other compatible iOS devices as an over the air (OTA) upgrade package. According to Apple the update contained 200 new features and tweaks, which included a new maps app, dubbed Apple Maps, Facebook integration and Passbook, an application that allows users to store their coupons, boarding passes, and tickets digitally. On September 18, 2013, Apple released iOS 7 and the iPhone 4S is among other compatible iOS devices that also received the update without any lagging issues compared to the iPhone 4. Although the device improved performance over iOS 7, some newer features that were released to newer models such as AirDrop and CarPlay were not supported. The iPhone 4S can also run iOS 8, which was released on September 17, 2014. Given that the device was supported for more than three years, some newer features of the software such as Apple Pay were not supported. It is also unable to work with Apple Watch, due to the relatively aged hardware. In fact, some users often reported that performance on the 4S is very slow, similar to how iOS 7 ran on the iPhone 4, and suggesting that they should not upgrade due to battery draining issues and hanging up on calls. Meanwhile, Apple released iOS 8.1.1, which brought slight improvements to the phone and the iPad 2, but it still did not run so fast as newer models.

iOS 9 controversy 

On June 8, 2015, Apple announced at the WWDC that the iPhone 4S would support iOS 9. This makes it the first iPhone to support five major versions of iOS, and the second iOS device to support five major versions (iOS 9 will support the iPad 2 as well, bringing its total up to six major versions of iOS supported). On December 22, 2015, Apple faced a class action lawsuit for crippling the iPhone 4S with the iOS 9 update with slow and buggy software to force users to buy a new iPhone.

On June 13, 2016, Apple announced that the iPhone 4S would not support iOS 10 due to hardware limitations.

It was briefly possible to downgrade the iPhone 4S from iOS 9 to iOS 6.1.3 following a signing window, which opened in January 2018  and closed in November 2019. The option to downgrade to iOS 6.1.3 also allowed an over-the-air update to iOS 8.4.1 due to technical limitations preventing a direct update from iOS 6 to iOS 9.

2019 GPS rollover update 
On July 22, 2019, Apple released iOS 9.3.6 for the iPhone 4S to fix issues caused by the GPS week number rollover. The issues would impact the accuracy of GPS location and set the device's date and time to an incorrect value, preventing connection to HTTPS servers and, consequently, Apple's servers for activation, iCloud and the iTunes and App stores.

Hardware 

The  uses the Apple A5 system-on-chip (SoC), also found in the iPad Mini (1st generation), that incorporates an Imagination Technologies PowerVR SGX543 graphics processing unit (GPU). This GPU features pixel, vertex, and geometry shader hardware supporting OpenGL ES 2.0. The SGX543 is an improved version of the GPU used in the  predecessor, the iPhone 4. The  uses a dual-core model that is integrated with the Apple A5 SoC in the same way as the iPad 2. Apple claims that the  has up to seven times faster graphics than the iPhone 4; this was corroborated by Epic Games president Mike Capps.

The  has 512 MB of DDR2 RAM. Maximum available storage size increased to 64 GB while the 32 GB and 16 GB model options were retained. In September 2013 Apple released an iPhone 4S for free with a two-year contract and but with only 8 GB of storage. There was an improvement in interactive multimedia applications compared to its predecessor.

The  has an improved cellular (GSM) antenna design over the iPhone 4. The new antenna is divided up into two pieces within the stainless steel band that wraps around the sides of the smartphone. The  can support a maximum theoretical download speed of up to 14.4 Mbps with HSDPA+. As a result of an upgraded radio chip inside it, in addition to being a world phone, both GSM and CDMA customers can roam internationally on GSM networks. It also supports Bluetooth 4.0.

The built-in gyroscope allows for some image stabilization for the camera while recording video, although it still has room for improvement, since state-of-the-art image stabilization algorithms do not need to use a gyroscope, but use image processing. Other features of the camera are macro (for close up pictures) and faster capture including being able to take its first image in 1.1 seconds and the next half a second later.

The  features a  960 by 640 pixel multitouch Retina display. It has two volume buttons and a ring-silent switch on the left side. On the top left there is a 3.5 mm headphone jack and a microphone that is used for both noise cancellation during calls and when in speakerphone/FaceTime (video calling) mode. The lock-power button is situated on the top right edge of the device. The right side of the device has a Micro-SIM card slot. The bottom of the device features a speaker output on the right and a microphone input on the left with the Apple proprietary 30-pin dock connector in the center. The  supports video out via AirPlay and various Apple A/V cables. Supported video formats include H.264 (1080p 30 frames per second maximum), MPEG-4 video, and motion JPEG (M-JPEG).

In addition to user inputs, the device also has several sensors that give the smartphone information about its orientation and external conditions. These include a three-axis gyroscope, an accelerometer, a proximity sensor, and an ambient light sensor. The  claimed to have 200 hours standby time, 8 hours talk time on 3G, 14 hours talk time on 2G, 6 hours 3G browsing, and 9 hours Wi-Fi browsing. Additionally, it can sustain up to 10 hours of video playback or 40 hours of audio playback.

Design 

The  has a stainless steel, dual cellular antenna design, identical to iPhone 4 CDMA. Apple redesigned the antenna in the  CDMA after some original iPhone 4 users reported cellular signal attenuation problems as a result of holding it in certain positions. The improved cellular radio in the smartphone can switch between two antennas, depending on which is sending/receiving the best signal. The bands on the iPhone 4S are divided into two antennas: cellular and Global Positioning System GPS, with Bluetooth and Wi-Fi reliant on an internal antenna.

The iPhone 4 and 4S were designed by Jonathan Ive. The '4' generation iPhones differ from earlier Apple designs; the bulges of the back panel as well as the band between the front and back are gone and have been replaced with flattened surfaces. The redesign reflects the utilitarianism and uniformity of existing Apple products, such as the iPad and the iMac.

The internal components are situated between two panels of aluminosilicate glass, described by Apple as being "chemically strengthened to be 20 times stiffer and 30 times harder than plastic," theoretically allowing it to be more scratch-resistant and durable than the prior models.

Reception

Critical reception 
Reviewers noted Siri, the new camera, and processing speeds as significant advantages over the prior model. Tim Stevens of Engadget said that the " does everything better than the iPhone 4, but it simply doesn't do anything substantially different." Joshua Topolsky of The Verge stated that "if this were to be a car, it would be a Mercedes" and that Siri is "probably one of the most novel applications Apple has ever produced." Brian Chen of Wired said that "the fifth-generation iPhone's superb camera and speedy dual-core processor are classy additions. But Siri is the reason people should buy this phone."

Retrevo surveyed more than 1,300 U.S. consumers and reported that 71 percent of all smartphone owners were not disappointed by the new , but 47 percent or almost a half of current iPhone 4 owners were; 12 percent were hoping for a bigger display, 21 percent wanted a refreshed design, and 29 percent desired 4G. Echoing technology pundits, Reuters suggested that the lack of a more radical departure from the iPhone 4 could open new market opportunities for rivals. Analyst C. K. Lu of Gartner believed that Apple no longer had the leading edge and that the 4S would only sell due to brand loyalty, as fans had been expecting an iPhone 5 with a thinner profile, edge-to-edge screen, and stronger features. These same fans had also wanted a cheaper, stripped-down iPhone 4.

Gaming on the  has been likened to the PlayStation Vita, that features the same SGX GPU only in a quad-core configuration, and the Nintendo 3DS handheld game consoles. Further, the ' ability to process 80 million polygons per second has been compared to the PlayStation 3 and the Xbox 360 home video game consoles that can process 275 million and 500 million polygons per second respectively.

Computer and Video Games's (CVG) deputy editor Andy Robinson told TechRadar that the "4S is certainly laying down some serious credibility for the iPhone as a core gaming device. Not only is it now pushing out games that simply eclipse the 3DS visually, but features like cloud saving and TV streaming support are really exciting for gamers."

In 2012, the iPhone 4S won the T3 "Work Gadget of the Year" award, beating RIM's Blackberry Bold 9900, rival Samsung's Galaxy Note amongst others.

Issues 

Since the introduction of the iPhone 4S, there have been several issues reported by users on internet forums that have been noted by media organizations such as CNN, Boy Genius Report, The Guardian, and PC World.
 No audio on outgoing calls 
 Sometimes there is no speaker audio for services such as web radio even though the speaker works fine when used as a telephone. This error may be due to a malfunctioning switch sensing the headphone plug and different handling of this information by different apps.
 Yellow-tinted screens (primarily affecting white-cased units) – it turned out the previous models had a less accurately calibrated screen and thus, displayed images with a bluish tint.
 Battery problems  – Apple released iOS 5.1.1 to diagnose and address the issue. However, the update has failed to completely resolve the underperforming battery issue. , Apple was still investigating the battery drain issue.
 Not understanding the accent of users from various countries while speaking to Siri.
 Bluetooth connectivity and range sometimes poor, deficient, and/or defective. The sound quality on the other end is muffled and/or undiscernible, with reports indicating the iPhone is likely the problem as opposed to the Bluetooth headsets.
The iPhone 4S had an issue where the Wi-Fi toggles would appear greyed out in both  Settings and the Control Center, which was mainly caused by thermal shock of the Wi-Fi antenna.

Commercial reception 
Unlike prior iPhone models, the number of sales of the iPhone 4 had not yet climaxed before the introduction of the 4S. Previous iPhone models were released during or after declining sales figures. In addition, iPhone 4 users had high marks for being satisfied with their smartphones. However, later in the day, Apple shares rebounded ending with a 1% gain.

More than 200,000 orders were placed within 12 hours of release through AT&T. The German telephone company Deutsche Telekom said they were "satisfied" with consumer interest. In addition, AT&T, Verizon, and Sprint sold-out initial stock by October 8, 2011, and by October 9 there was a 1–2 week estimate on new orders to be filled. On October 20, 2011, AT&T surpassed one million  activations. On October 10, Apple announced that more than one million orders for the  had been received within the first 24 hours of it being on sale, beating the 600,000 device record set by the iPhone 4. The 16-month wait between the iPhone 4 and 4S may have contributed to overwhelming sales as well.

Phil Schiller, Apple's senior vice president of Worldwide Product Marketing, stated that the " is off to a great start with more than four million sold in its first weekend—the most ever for a phone and more than double the iPhone 4 launch during its first three days." The used smartphone market saw unprecedented rates of trade-ins in the weeks leading up to the 4S announcement, and after it, there was a drop in prices offered. Previous generation iPhones are recirculated through the markets via various methods and third-party buyers may purchase older generation iPhones. Apple also buys back previous generation iPhones under a special program. On April 24, 2012, AT&T announced that 7.6 million iPhone units were activated in Q4 2011, and 4.3 million in Q1 2012. In total, AT&T sold 5.5 million smartphones in the first quarter of 2012, out of which 78% were iPhones.

See also 
Comparison of smartphones
List of iOS devices
 Timeline of iPhone models

Notes

References

External links 

 – official site at Apple

Computer-related introductions in 2011
Products and services discontinued in 2012
Products and services discontinued in 2013
Products and services discontinued in 2014
Products and services discontinued in 2016

Mobile phones introduced in 2011
Videotelephony
IOS
Active noise control mobile phones
 
Discontinued flagship smartphones